Euseius obtectus is a species of mite in the family Phytoseiidae.

References

obtectus
Articles created by Qbugbot
Animals described in 1992